Don Wycherley (born 15 September 1967, Skibbereen, County Cork) is an Irish actor. He played Father Cyril McDuff in Father Ted, Father Aidan O'Connell in Ballykissangel, and Raymond in Bachelors Walk.

Wycherley is a fluent Irish speaker. He is the brother-in-law of actress Tina Kellegher. His father was Florence Wycherley, an independent Teachta Dála (TD) for Cork West from 1957 to 1961.

Selected filmography
 Father Ted (TV series; 1995–1998)
 Michael Collins (1996)
 Ballykissangel (TV series; 1998–2001)
 The General (1998)
 One Man's Hero (1999)
 Bachelors Walk (TV series; 2001–2003)
 Veronica Guerin (2003)
 Shrooms (2007)
 Garage (2007)
 Perrier's Bounty (2009)
 Ondine (2009)
 Zonad (2009)
 Pentecost (short film; 2011)
 Scúp (TV series; 2013)
 Moone Boy (TV series; 2014)
 Sing Street (2016)
 Wild Mountain Thyme (2020)

IFTA Awards

References

External links

Irish male film actors
Irish male television actors
Living people
1967 births
People from Skibbereen